In control theory, it is often required to check if a nonautonomous system is stable or not. To cope with this it is necessary to use some special comparison functions. Class  functions belong to this family:

Definition: a continuous function  is said to belong to class  if:
 it is strictly increasing;
 it is s.t. .
In fact, this is nothing but the definition of the norm except for the triangular inequality.

Definition: a continuous function  is said to belong to class  if:
 it belongs to class ;
 it is s.t. ;
 it is s.t. .

A nondecreasing positive definite function  satisfying all conditions of class  other than being strictly increasing can be upper and lower bounded by class  functions as follows:

Thus, to proceed with the appropriate analysis, it suffices to bound the function of interest with continuous nonincreasing positive definite functions.
In other words, when a function belongs to the  it means that the function is radially unbounded.

See also
 Class kappa-ell function
 H. K. Khalil, Nonlinear systems, Prentice-Hall 2001. Sec. 4.4 - Def. 4.2.

Control theory